Champion House is a BBC television drama series.

The series dealt with the Yorkshire-based Champion family and the dramas surrounding the family textiles firm, Champion Mills. Two series were made between 1967 and 1968. The cast included Edward Chapman, Nicole Maurey, Pamela Manson, Maurice Kaufmann and Virginia Stride.

Champion House was created by Hazel Adair and Peter Ling, who had previously devised Compact and Crossroads.

The series was a casualty of the BBC's wiping policy of the era and none of the 30 episodes is known to have survived.

References

External links
 

1967 British television series debuts
1968 British television series endings
1960s British drama television series
BBC television dramas
Lost BBC episodes
English-language television shows